The Golden Bear is the top prize at the Berlin International Film Festival.

Golden Bear may also refer to:

Animals 
 California golden bear (Ursus arctos californicus), an extinct subspecies of the brown bear
 The Golden Bear (legend), recalled in legends and stories of American Old West.

Sports

Team name or mascot
 Alberta Golden Bears, men's sports teams at the University of Alberta
 California Golden Bears, nickname for teams of the University of California, Berkeley
 Concordia University (Saint Paul, Minnesota)
 Kutztown University of Pennsylvania
 Shelbyville Senior High School, Shelbyville, Indiana
 Upper Arlington High School, Upper Arlington, Ohio
 Upper Moreland High School, Upper Moreland, Pennsylvania
 Vestal High School, Vestal, New York
 West Virginia University Institute of Technology
 Western New England University

Competitions 
 Golden Bear of Zagreb, a figure skating competition

Other 
 A nickname for Jack Nicklaus
 , one of several merchant ships
 Golden Bear (ship), a training vessel of the California Maritime Academy
 Golden Bear (band), a rock band from Austin, TX
 The Golden Bear (nightclub), a nightclub in Huntington Beach, California
 A line of ammunition made by the Barnaul Cartridge Plant

See also 
 Goldie & Bear